Pristiophorus is a genus of sawsharks found in the Pacific, Atlantic and Indian oceans.  Members of this genus differ from the Sixgill Sawshark (Pliotrema warreni) in having five gill slits. Their rostral sawteeth lack prominent transverse ridges on the basal ledges, and the large teeth are not posteriorly serrated.

Species
There are currently seven recognized species in this genus:
 Pristiophorus cirratus (Latham, 1794) (Longnose sawshark)
 Pristiophorus delicatus Yearsley, Last & W. T. White, 2008 (Tropical sawshark)
 Pristiophorus japonicus Günther, 1870 (Japanese sawshark)
 Pristiophorus lanae Ebert & Wilms, 2013 (Lana's sawshark)
Pristiophorus lanceolatus Davis 1888
 Pristiophorus nancyae Ebert & Cailliet, 2011 (African dwarf sawshark) 
 Pristiophorus nudipinnis Günther, 1870 (Shortnose sawshark)
 Pristiophorus peroniensis Yearsley, Last & W. T. White, 2008 (Eastern Australian sawshark)
 Pristiophorus schroederi S. Springer & Bullis, 1960 (Bahamas sawshark)
Pristiophorus striatus Underwood and Schlogl 2013

References

 
Shark genera
Taxa named by Johannes Peter Müller
Taxa named by Friedrich Gustav Jakob Henle